Kenet may refer to:
 Kenet, Mazandaran, village in Kuhestan Rural District, Central District of Behshahr County, Mazandaran Province, Iran 
Kenet Works, Swedish company acquired by Yahoo
KENET, Kenya Education Network